Senopterina is a genus of signal flies (insects in the family Platystomatidae). There are about 17 described species in Senopterina.

Species
These 17 species belong to the genus Senopterina:

S. alligata Wulp, 1898 c g
S. brevipes (Fabricius, 1805)
S. caerulescens Loew, 1873 i c g b
S. chiriquiana Hennig, 1940 c g
S. cyanea (Giglio-tos, 1893) i c g
S. distincta (Walker, 1849) c g
S. flexivitta (Walker, 1861) i c g b
S. foxleei Shewell, 1962 i c g b
S. fuscicosta Hendel, 1914
S. infuscata Hendel, 1914
S. macularis (Fabricius, 1805)
S. mexicana (Macquart, 1843) i c g
S. ochripennis Enderlein, 1924
S. varia Coquillett, 1900 i c g b
S. verrucosa Hendel, 1914
S. violacea (Macquart, 1843) c

Data sources: i = ITIS, c = Catalogue of Life, g = GBIF, b = Bugguide.net

References

Further reading

External links

 

Platystomatidae
Articles created by Qbugbot
Tephritoidea genera
Taxa named by Pierre-Justin-Marie Macquart